The 1970 United States Senate election in Vermont took place on November 3, 1970. Incumbent Republican Winston L. Prouty successfully ran for re-election to third term in the United States Senate, defeating Former Democratic Governor Philip H. Hoff.

Republican primary

Results

Democratic primary

Results

General election

Results

References

Vermont
1970
United States Senate